Brisbane has a humid subtropical climate (Köppen climate classification: Cfa) with year-round period with warm to hot temperatures. Brisbane generally experiences 3 months of mild cool winter from June to August.

Temperatures 
Seasonality is not pronounced, and average maximum temperatures of above  persist from October through to April.

Due to its proximity to the Coral Sea of the Pacific Ocean and a warm ocean current, Brisbane's overall temperature variability is somewhat less than most Australian capitals. Temperatures only occasionally reach  or more.

Records of temperatures 
On 19 July 2007, Brisbane's temperature fell below the freezing point for the first time since records began, registering  at the airport station.

Dew point

Precipitation 

From November to March, thunderstorms are common over Brisbane, with the more severe events accompanied by large damaging hail stones, torrential rain and destructive winds. On an annual basis, Brisbane averages 124 clear days.

Brisbane's wettest day occurred on 21 January 1887, when  of rain fell on the city, the highest maximum daily rainfall of Australia's capital cities. The wettest month on record was February 1893, when  of rain fell, although in the last 30 years the record monthly rainfall has been a much lower  from December 2010. Very occasionally a whole month will pass with no recorded rainfall, the last time this happened was August 1991.

From 2001 until 2010, Brisbane and surrounding temperate areas had been experiencing the most severe drought in over a century, with dam levels dropping to 16.9% of their capacity on 10 August 2007. Residents were mandated by local laws to observe level 6 water restrictions on gardening and other outdoor water usage. Per capita water usage was below 140 litres per day, giving Brisbane one of the lowest per capita usages of water of any developed city in the world. On 9 January 2011, an upper low crossed north of Brisbane and dropped rainfall on an already saturated southeast coast of Queensland, resulting in severe flooding and damage in Brisbane and the surrounding area; the same storm season also caused the water storage to climb to over 98% of maximum capacity and broke the drought. Water restrictions have been replaced with water conservation measures that aim at a target of 200 litres per day/per person, but consumption is rarely over 160 litres. In November 2011, Brisbane saw 22 days with no recorded rainfall, which was the driest start to a November since 1919.

Humidity

Sunshine

Wind 
Brisbane also lies in the Tropical Cyclone risk area, although cyclones are rare. The last to affect Brisbane was Severe Tropical Cyclone Oma in February 2019. The city is susceptible to severe thunderstorms in the spring and summer months; on 16 November 2008 a severe storm caused tremendous damage in the outer suburbs, most notably The Gap. Roofs were torn off houses and hundreds of trees were felled. More recently, on 27 November 2014, a very strong storm made a direct hit on the city centre. Described as 'the worst storm in a decade,' very large hail, to the size of cricket balls, smashed skyscraper windows while a flash flood tore through the CBD. Dust storms in Brisbane are extremely rare; on 23 September 2009, however, a severe dust storm blanketed Brisbane, as well as other parts of eastern Australia.

Temperature of sea 

UV index

See also 
 Climate of Australia
 Geography of Brisbane
 Environment of Australia
 Australian region tropical cyclone
 Climate change in Australia
 Effects of global warming on Australia

References 

Brisbane
Brisbane